Robert Murcutt (1791 – 1835) was an English first-class cricketer associated with the Cambridge Town Club who played in the 1820s. He is recorded in two matches, totalling 20 runs with a highest score of 13 not out. His son, Daniel, was also a first-class cricketer.

References

Bibliography
 

1791 births
1835 deaths
English cricketers
English cricketers of 1787 to 1825
Cambridge Town Club cricketers
People from Grantchester